The 1948 United States Senate election in Illinois took place on November 2, 1948. Incumbent Republican Charles W. Brooks lost reelection to Democrat Paul Douglas.

Election information
The primaries and general election coincided with those of other federal elections (United States President and House), as well as those for state elections.

Primaries were held April 13, 1948.

Democratic primary

Republican primary

General election

See also
1948 United States Senate elections

References

1948
Illinois
United States Senate